Type 95 can refer to:

 Kawasaki Ki-10, Allied reporting name "Perry", a Japanese fighter also designated the Army Type 95 Fighter
 Nakajima E8N, Allied reporting name "Dave", a Japanese scout plane also designated the Navy Type 95 Reconnaissance Seaplane Model 1
 QBZ-95, Chinese assault rifle
 Type 95 Collapsible Boat, used by the Imperial Japanese Army
 Type 95 Ha-Go, a Japanese light tank
 Type 95 heavy tank, a Japanese heavy tank
 Type 95 reconnaissance car, used by the Japanese from 1937
 Type 95 SPAAA, a Chinese anti-aircraft vehicle
 Type 95 torpedo, a torpedo used by the Imperial Japanese Navy

See also

 
 
 95 (disambiguation)
 T95 (disambiguation)